Prakash Sawant (1950-2015), better known as Bala Sawant, was an Indian politician and a member of the Maharashtra Legislative Assembly & a senior Shiv Sena leader . He was first elected to the Assembly in the 2009 election to the Bandra East constituency. He died on 9 Jan 2015.

Political career 
Bala Sawant was first elected to the Bombay Municipal Corporation BMC as a corporator from Kherwadi in 1997. He served two more terms as a corporator in the BMC. He was re-elected to Vidhan Sabha as a Maharashtra Legislative Assembly in 2014. 
Sawant headed the BMC's law panel for two consecutive terms.

Personal life 
Bala Sawant was married to Trupti Sawant with whom he had a daughter. After his death his wife Trupti Sawant won the election from Bandra East constituency the seat he held and that was vacated after his death.

Positions held
Member of the Maharashtra Legislative Assembly 2009 & 2014

References 

People from Bandra
Marathi politicians
Members of the Maharashtra Legislative Assembly
Shiv Sena politicians
Politicians from Mumbai
Indian Hindus
2015 deaths
21st-century Indian politicians